Sylvie Vauclair (born on March 7, 1946, in Saint-Germain-en-Laye) is a French astrophysicist (at the Institut de Recherche en Astrophysique et Planétologie), and professor emeritus (at the Toulouse III - Paul Sabatier University), where she taught for more than 30 years. She also taught for a decade at the Paris Diderot University. She has served as president of the Société Française d'Astronomie et d'Astrophysique.

Biography
After two theses under the direction of Hubert Reeves and then Evry Schatzman, her scientific work first focused on the formation and evolution of the chemical elements that make up matter in the universe: sun, stars, primordial universe. She particularly studied the importance of the selective diffusion of atoms in stellar conditions and its consequences for their structure and evolution. She has shown the repercussions of these processes on the evolution of matter in the Universe since the Big Bang.

She has made important contributions to helioseismology and asteroseismology by studying the influence of the detailed internal chemical composition on the observed frequencies. In particular, she studied the vibrations of several central stars of planetary systems to determine their precise parameters. In 2004, she participated in the discovery of the smallest known planet around the star Mu Arae. She is responsible for the discovery that the star Iota Horologii in the middle of the Hyades star cluster, observed in the Southern Hemisphere.

An international symposium was held in her honor in 2013, on the topic of interactions between microscopic (atomic) and macroscopic (hydrodynamic) phenomena occurring in stars. This is a subject to which she has contributed a lot during her career, with the aim of better understanding the structure and evolution of stars.

Vauclair is also a musician. She is interested in the relationship between philosophy, art and science and participates in many transdisciplinary events and in social debates.

Awards and honours
 1995: Member, Académie de l'air et de l'espace
 1999: Cercle d'Oc Prize
 2000: Member, Academia Europaea
 2002: Scientific book prize, Orsay
 2002: Senior member, Institut Universitaire de France
 2008: Prize, Academy of Occitania
 2009: Grand prize, friends of the Cité de l'espace

Distinctions
 1994: Knight, Ordre des Palmes académiques
 2007: Officer, Ordre des Palmes académiques
 2009: Knight, Legion of Honour
 2015: Officer, Ordre national du Mérite

Selected works
 La nouvelle symphonie des étoiles, l'humanité face au cosmos, Odile Jacob, 2021 
 De l'origine de l'Univers à l'origine de la vie, Odile Jacob, 2017 
 Dialogues avec l'Univers, Odile Jacob, 2015 
 La nouvelle musique des sphères, Odile Jacob, 2013 
 La Terre, l'espace et au-delà, Albin Michel, 2009 
 La naissance des éléments : du Big-Bang à la Terre, Odile Jacob, 2006 
 La chanson du Soleil , Albin Michel, coll. « Sciences d'aujourd'hui », 2002 
 La symphonie des étoiles , Albin Michel, coll. « Sciences d'aujourd'hui », 1997 
 L'observatoire du Pic du Midi de Bigorre, Loubatières, 1992 
 L'astrophysique nucléaire, PUF, coll. « Que sais-je? », 1972

Textbooks
 Éléments de physique statistique, hasard, organisation, évolution, Inter-Éditions, 1993 
 An Introduction to Nuclear Astrophysics, Reidel, 1979

See also
 Meanings of minor planet names: 352001–353000

References

1946 births
Living people
People from Saint-Germain-en-Laye
French astrophysicists
French academics
French women academics
20th-century French women writers
21st-century French women writers